Dibenzo-1,4-dioxin, also dibenzodioxin or dibenzo-p-dioxin (dibenzo-para-dioxin), is a polycyclic heterocyclic organic compound in which two benzene rings are connected by a 1,4-dioxin ring. Its molecular formula is C12H8O2. The two oxygen atoms occupy opposite (para-) positions in the six-membered dioxin ring.

Dibenzodioxin is the carbon skeleton of the poisonous polychlorinated dibenzodioxins (PCDDs), often called dioxins. The most harmful PCDD is 2,3,7,8-tetrachlorodibenzodioxin (TCDD). Dioxins and dioxin-like compounds is a category of pollutants that includes PCDDs and other compounds that have similar structure, toxicity, and persistence. Dibenzodioxin is also the skeleton of the polybrominated dibenzodioxins.

Isomer
The general name dibenzodioxin usually refers to dibenzo-p-dioxin.

The isomeric compound dibenzo-o-dioxin (dibenzo-ortho-dioxin) or dibenzo-1,2-dioxin, like the unstable 1,2-dioxin, has two adjacent oxygen atoms (ortho-). No detailed information is available on this isomer, but it is expected to be highly unstable, with peroxide-like characteristics.

See also
Thianthrene, the sulfur analog of dibenzodioxin

References

External links

Dibenzodioxins